Tiszaligeti Stadion, is a multi-purpose stadium in Szolnok, Hungary.  It is mainly used mostly for football matches and hosts the home matches of Szolnoki MÁV FC of the Nemzeti Bajnokság I.  The stadium has a capacity of 4,000 spectators.

References

Football venues in Hungary
Multi-purpose stadiums in Hungary